Two synchronised swimming event were held on Wednesday 6 and Thursday 7 October – solo and duet – for women only.

Medalists

Medal table

Participating nations

References

External links
 Aquatics – XIX commonwealth Games 2010 Delhi
 Schedule

 
Commonwealth Games
2010 Commonwealth Games events